The demographics of Uttar Pradesh is a complex topic, which is undergoing dynamic change.  Uttar Pradesh is India's most populous state, and the largest subdivision in the world. It has a population of about 199,812,341 as per the 2011 census. If it were a separate country, Uttar Pradesh would be the world's fifth most populous nation, next only to China, India, the United States of America and Indonesia. Uttar Pradesh has a population more than that of Pakistan. There is an average population density of 828 persons per km² i.e. 2,146 per sq mi. The capital of Uttar Pradesh is Lucknow, and Allahabad serves as the state’s judicial capital. Hindus and Muslims both consider the state as a holy place.

The peripheral regions of Uttar Pradesh, are home to a number of tribal communities such as Agaria, Baiga, Bhar, Bhoksa, Bind, Chero, Gond, Kol and Korwa.  Five of these tribal communities have been recognised by the Government of India as disadvantaged scheduled tribes, viz. Tharus, Boksas, Bhotias, Jaunswaris and Rajis. The Literacy rate of the state according to the 2011 Census is 70.69%. With the literacy rate for Males at 79.20%, while it is 59.30% for the Females. While this is still below the national average of 74.04% (82.14% for men, 65.16% for women) the rate of growth has been much higher in Uttar Pradesh as compared to the rest of India.

District 
As of the 2011 census, Allahabad is the most populous district of Uttar Pradesh while Mahoba being the least populated. Only 3 districts of Jaunpur, Azamgarh and Deoria have a sex ratio greater than 1000 while Gautam Buddha Nagar stands lowest in the tally with a very low ratio of 851. On the contrary, Gautam Buddha Nagar scores highest in literacy rate at 80.12% and Kanpur Nagar 2nd at 79.54%, while both being the poorest districts in terms of sex-ratio, depicting a negative-correlation among literacy and sex-ratio in this case. Districts of Srawasti, Bahraich and Balrampur haven't even crossed the 50% literacy mark yet.

The following table enumerates population, sex-ratio and literacy rates for each district of Uttar Pradesh:

Rank of districts

Following rankings are as per Population Census 2011.

By area
 Lakhimpur Kheri -8,780
 Sonbhadra - 6,999
 Hardoi - 5,986
 Bahraich - 5,745
 Sitapur - 5,743

By population
 Allahabad - 5,954,391
 Moradabad - 4,772,006
 Ghaziabad - 4,681,645
 Azamgarh - 4,613,913
 Lucknow - 4,589,838
 Kanpur Nagar - 4,581,268
 Jaunpur - 4,494,204
 Sitapur - 4,483,992
 Bareilly - 4,448,359
 Gorakhpur - 4,440,895

By population density
 Ghaziabad - 1995
 Varanasi - 1954
 Lucknow - 1456
 Sant Ravidas Nagar (Bhadohi) - 1409
 Kanpur Nagar - 1369

By literacy
 Gautam Budha Nagar(Noida) - 80.12%
 Kanpur Nagar - 79.65%
 Auraiya - 78.95%
 Etawah - 78.41%
 Ghaziabad - 78.07%

By sex ratio
 Jaunpur - 1024
 Azamgarh -1018
 Deoria - 1003
 Mau - 984
 Pratapgarh - 982
 Ambedkar Nagar- 978
 Faizabad - 972
 Sultanpur - 965
 Basti - 963
 Sant Kabir Nagar -960

Religion
In Uttar Pradesh the religion-wise percentage of population is Hindus 79.7, Muslims 19.3, Sikhs 0.3, Christians 0.2, Jains 0.1, Buddhists 0.1 while 0.3 of people have other religion or didn't state one.

District-wise religious population 
Population count for each district (with percentages) as per 2011 Census.

Literacy among women is quite low, going as low as 50.59% in Muslim community. On the contrary, the Jain community with quite high literacy rates, for both males and females as well. Also noteworthy is that Sikh and Hindu communities have very poor sex-ratios.

Caste

For accurate caste population data in India, the Government of India has not publicly released Socio Economic and Caste Census 2011 caste population data for every single non-SC/ST castes, General castes, OBC/EBCs in India, hence no official figures are available for the same.

As per estimations based on 2011 census, Dalits constitute 21.1% of Uttar Pradesh population. Mallah community is divided in 27 sub-castes. Other Backward Classes (OBCs) constitute 40% of Uttar Pradesh’s population. Yadavs form the single largest group amongst the OBCs, constituting around 40 percent, and forming almost 15 percent of the state's population. There are 200-odd OBCs in U.P. In Uttar Pradesh, Muslims are divided into 68 castes and sub-castes, 35 of them are OBCs. Forward castes constitute around 18-20% of Uttar Pradesh population, in which Brahmins are about 9% and Rajputs are 8%.

Racial and ancestral makeup

Uttar Pradesh is the most populous state in India with a population of over 199.5 million people on 1 March 2011. It is more populated than the world's 242 countries. If independent it would be the 6th largest country in the world as per Population.

At the 2011 census of India, 79.7% of Uttar Pradesh population is Hindu. Muslims make up 19.3% of the population, most of whom are Rohillas, a clan of ethnic Pathans. The remaining population consists of Sikhs, Buddhists, Christians and Jains.

The population of Uttar Pradesh is divided into numerous castes and sub-castes. Historically, Hindu society is divided into four sub-divisions or varnas, the Brahmins, Kshatriyas, Vaishyas and Shudras. Muslims are also divided as the Shias and Sunnis. In actual practice, Hindu society in generally used to be divided into numerous lineage groups called jatis. Each jati is then sub-divided into clans, called gotras.

The peripheral regions of Uttar Pradesh, are home to a number of tribal communities such as Agaria, Baiga, Bhar, Bhoksa, Chero, Gond, Kol and Korwa. Five of these tribal communities have been recognised by the Government of India as disadvantaged scheduled tribes, viz. Tharus, Boksas, Bhotias, Jaunswaris and Rajis.

Languages

Most people in Uttar Pradesh speak Hindustani, which in a literate form is referred to as Hindi and Urdu. Bhojpuri is the second most widely spoken language of Uttar Pradesh.

In addition, the people of Uttar Pradesh speak a variety of local dialects of Hindi, which are not always easy to classify or identify. E.g., the language of Allahabad is often classified today as Awadhi, but, its actually a mix of several surrounding dialects, including Awadhi and Bundelkhandi. Most Allahabadis refer to their dialect as Allahabadi. Furthermore, in neighbouring Banda, the dialect is exactly the same, but, they refer to it as Bundelkhandi.

It's said that in India, the dialects change every 50-mile, and its particularly true of Uttar Pradesh.

The dialect map of Uttar Pradesh is complex, but, in general, in three of the five sub regions of UP, viz, the Doab, Rohilkhand, and Bundelkhand, both Western and Eastern Hindi, as well as a mixture of the two are spoken.  E.g., in Upper and parts of lower Doab (till Etawah), various forms of western Hindi are spoken, including Khari boli and Brij Bhasha. In the rest of lower Doab, various mixes of western and Eastern Hindi (Brij Bhasha/ Bundelkhandi and Awadhi) are spoken). Likewise, in Western Bundelkhand, Bundeli (a language closely related with Brij Bhasha) is spoken, while in Eastern Bundelkhand the dialect is still called 'Bundeli' but is part of Eastern Hindi (actually a mixture of Western and Eastern Hindi). In Western Rohilkhand, Khari boli is spoken. in Central Rohilkhand a mix of Awadhi and Khari boli is spoken, while in Eastern Rohilkhand, Awadhi is the dialect.

In Awadh too there exist a wide variation in the dialects spoken.
Awadhi is the main dialect in the Awadh sub-region of Uttar Pradesh. But, its form changes from west to east.

As mentioned earlier, often these dialects merge into each other, for example in Shahjahanpur, in Rohilkhand, Khari boli merges into Awadhi.

In eastern Uttar Pradesh, Bhojpuri language is spoken.  It is the second most widely spoken language of Uttar Pradesh after Hindi. It belongs to the Magadhan group of Indo-Aryan languages. This region is known as Bhojpur or Purvanchal. The Bhojpuri variant of Kaithi is the indigenous script of Bhojpuri language.

See also 

 Distribution of Scheduled Castes by District in Uttar Pradesh
 List of Rajput clans of Uttar Pradesh

References 

Uttar Pradesh
Uttar